Esteghlal Futsal Club was an Iranian futsal club based in Tehran, Iran. Esteghlal was the champion of the Premiere Futsal League in 2001 and 2002.

Honours 
National
 Premiere Futsal League
 Champions (2): 2000–2001, 2001–02
 Runners-up (1): 2002–03

Season-by-season 
The table below chronicles the achievements of the Club in various competitions.

Managers 
  Ahmad Taheri 
  Mohammad Reza Heidarian

Player

World Cup Players 

 World Cup 2000
  Mohammad Reza Heidarian
  Mojtaba Moeini
  Babak Masoumi

 World Cup 2004
  Mohammad Hashemzadeh
  Kazem Sadeghi

Notable players 
  Ahmad Baghbanbashi
  Siamak Dadashi
  Mohammad Hashemzadeh
  Mohammad Reza Heidarian
  Babak Masoumi
  Kazem Mohammadi
  Aziz Molazem
  Reza Nasseri
  Amir Shamsaei
  Vahid Shamsaei
  Mostafa Nazari

See also 
 Esteghlal Tehran Football Club

References 

Sport in Tehran
Defunct futsal clubs in Iran
Futsal clubs in Iran
2008 disestablishments in Iran
Esteghlal F.C.